"Hylarana" montivaga, sometimes known as Langbian Plateau frog or Chantaburi stream frog, is a species of "true frog" in the family Ranidae. Its generic placement is currently unsettled. It is known from the Langbian Plateau in southern-central Vietnam; records from elsewhere (including Thailand) refer to other species.

Habitat and conservation
It is currently listed as "endangered" by the International Union for Conservation of Nature (ICUN). This is due to agriculture and aquaculture within their habitats, and biological resource use.

References

True frogs
Amphibians of Vietnam
Endemic fauna of Vietnam
Amphibians described in 1921
Taxa named by Malcolm Arthur Smith